Anomis grisea is a moth of the family Erebidae. It is found in southern Madagascar.

The wingspan of the adults is about 28–30 mm.

References

Catocalinae
Moths of Madagascar
Moths described in 1907